Three Around Edith (German: Die Drei um Edith) is a 1929 German silent crime film directed by Erich Waschneck and starring Camilla Horn, Jack Trevor and Gustav Diessl. It was shot at the National Studios in Berlin. The film's art direction was by Alfred Junge.

Cast
 Camilla Horn as Lady Edith Trent  
 Jack Trevor as Thomas Morland  
 Gustav Diessl as Roger Brown  
 Paul Hörbiger as Nick  
 Fritz Rasp as Pistol  
 Adele Sandrock as Ediths Tante  
 Hubert von Meyerinck as Scherbe  
 Lothar Körner as Beby

References

Bibliography
 Hans-Michael Bock and Tim Bergfelder. The Concise Cinegraph: An Encyclopedia of German Cinema. Berghahn Books.

External links

1929 films
Films of the Weimar Republic
Films directed by Erich Waschneck
German silent feature films
National Film films
German black-and-white films
Films based on German novels